Garfield railway station is located on the Gippsland line in Victoria, Australia. It serves the town of Garfield, and it opened on 17 December 1884 as Cannibal Creek Siding. It was renamed Garfield on 28 March 1887.

The station was destroyed by fire on 20 February 1924. In 1954, electrification of the line was provided between Pakenham and Warragul, and in 1956, the line between Tynong and Bunyip was duplicated, with a new Down platform (Platform 2) provided.

In 1971, a crossover at the station was abolished, and in 1978, the Up end connection to the siding was abolished. The siding was abolished altogether in 1987.

In 1998, electrified services between Pakenham and Warragul ceased, with de-electrification between those stations occurring in 2001.

Platforms and services

Garfield has two side platforms. It is serviced by V/Line Traralgon and Bairnsdale line services.

Platform 1:
  services to Southern Cross in the morning and early afternoon
  services to Traralgon and Bairnsdale in the late afternoon and evening

Platform 2:
  services to Traralgon and Bairnsdale in the morning and early afternoon
  services to Southern Cross in the late afternoon and evening

Transport links

Warragul Bus Lines operates three routes to and from Garfield station, under contract to Public Transport Victoria:
to Nar Nar Goon station
to Pakenham station
to Traralgon Plaza

References

External links
Victorian Railway Stations Gallery
Melway map

Railway stations in Australia opened in 1884
Regional railway stations in Victoria (Australia)
Railway stations in the Shire of Cardinia